Barbora Laláková (born 2 May 1981 in Brandýs nad Labem) is a Czech athlete specialising in the high jump. She reached the final of the 2007 World Championships finishing 15th.

Her outdoor personal best is 1.95 metres (2007). Her indoor personal best of 1.99 metres (2006) is the current national record.

Competition record

References

1981 births
Living people
Czech female high jumpers
Competitors at the 2003 Summer Universiade